Karol Stricker (May 21, 1959 – January 14, 2008) was an American painter of fine porcelain. Her Native American and fantasy works were well received for their level of detail and attention to historical accuracy. Her artwork has been exhibited in over 200 galleries worldwide, and is in private collections and museums across the globe. She painted in the Spurgeon style of ceramic painting which she pioneered.

Personal life
Stricker was born in Buffalo, New York, the child of Thomas and Margaret McEniry, and grew up in Wharton, New Jersey during the 1960s and 1970s, where she studied art with local artisans.

She gave birth to two children, Michael and Tara Glenn, and had six grandchildren including the artist Chynna Rose, Cierra Marie, Alexandria Rose, Caleb Michael, Gabriel Mathejis, and Alexander Shaffer. She also had a brother, Thomas McEniry III, and twin sisters Karen Diggs, and Kathy Halderman.

She was married to Michael Glenn Sr. in 1976. They subsequently divorced in 1981. Stricker took up painting at this point and continued to improve her technique, while raising a family.

She had two other marriages, to Lee Stricker and Timothy Stricker during the late 1980s and early 1990s. When her husband Timothy went to prison in 1995 she turned back to her art and made a name for herself in Charleston, Illinois.

As her health declined she lost the interest in ceramics she once had, and only a few precious pieces remain from this time.

At the time of her death on January 14, 2008 she was 48 years old.

Sources

Ceramics Monthly.January/February 1994
The Lighthouse Review.4.7(December 1996)

1959 births
People from Morris County, New Jersey
Porcelain painters
2008 deaths
Artists from Buffalo, New York
People from Charleston, Illinois
20th-century American women artists
American women painters
20th-century American painters
Painters from New York (state)
Painters from New Jersey
Painters from Illinois